Sainte-Anastasie is the name or part of the name of several communes in France:

 Sainte-Anastasie, in the Cantal department
 Sainte-Anastasie, in the Gard department
 Sainte-Anastasie-sur-Issole, in the Var department